Ashland Regional Airport  is a public use airport in Worthington, Greenup County, Kentucky, owned by the Ashland Regional Airport Board. It is located six nautical miles (11 km) northwest of the central business district of Ashland, a city in Boyd County, Kentucky, United States. Currently, the airport serves local charter and private aircraft. Community events, such as car and air shows, also take place at the airport.

Although most U.S. airports use the same three-letter location identifier for the FAA and IATA, this airport is assigned DWU by the FAA but has no designation from the IATA.

History
It opened in 1953 as Ashland-Boyd County Airport and featured a  runway with a  clearance.

The airport was once used extensively by the oil manufacturing company Ashland Inc. before the company's corporate headquarters was moved from Russell to Covington.

Facilities and aircraft
It has one asphalt paved runway designated 10/28 which measures 5,602 by 100 feet (1,707 x 30 m).

For the 12-month period ending July 23, 2007, the airport had 4,500 aircraft operations, an average of 12 per day: 96% general aviation, 2% air taxi and 2% military. At that time there were 47 aircraft based at this airport: 77% single-engine, 15% multi-engine, 4% jet and 4% helicopter.

References

External links
 Ashland Regional Airport, official site
 Aerial photo from USGS The National Map, 15 March 1995
 
 

Airports in Kentucky
Ashland, Kentucky
Transportation buildings and structures in Greenup County, Kentucky
Airports established in 1953
1953 establishments in Kentucky